Garfa is a southern neighborhood of Kolkata, India.  This area is surrounded by Haltu, Nandi bagan, Jadavpur and Kalikapur. Starting as a refugee colony within Jadavpur, Garfa is now primarily a residential area within Kolkata.

Geography
Garfa police station is in the South Suburban division of Kolkata Police. It is located at Garfa Deaf and Dumb School Premises.

Patuli Women police station has jurisdiction over all police districts under the jurisdiction of the South Suburban Division i.e. Netaji Nagar, Jadavpur, Bansdroni, Garfa, and Patuli.

Jadavpur, Thakurpukur, Behala, Purba, Tiljala, Metiabruz, Nadial, and Kasba police stations were transferred from South 24 Parganas to Kolkata in 2011. Except for Metiabruz, all the police stations were split into two. The newest police stations are in Parnasree, Haridevpur, Garfa, Patuli, Survey Park, Pragati Maidan, Bansdroni, and Rajabagan.

Transport
Garfa Main Road and Kalikapur Road intersects near Garfa. Buses ply along both roads. Auto rickshaws, app-based cab services such as Ola, Uber, and taxies are also available.

Dhakuria railway station and Jadavpur railway station are the nearest railway stations.

Culture
On the cultural front, Garfa hosts some major Kali Pujas and Durga Pujas of South Kolkata.

Educational institutions
Here is a list of educational institutions situated near Garfa area.
 Garfa Dhirendranath Memorial Boys' High School
 Garfa Dhirendranath Memorial Girls' High School

See also
 Jadavpur
 Haltu

References

Neighbourhoods in Kolkata